A caisson lighthouse (also referred to as a sparkplug lighthouse, or bug light) is a type of lighthouse whose superstructure rests on a concrete or metal caisson. Caisson lighthouses were developed in the late nineteenth century as a cheaper alternative to screwpile lighthouses. The caisson design was also more efficient as it could better withstand harsh weather, and was not as fragile. Caisson lighthouses usually have living quarters made of cast iron, although some brick examples are known. The two American nicknames were later coined because of the structure's shape.

Gallery

See also

References

Lighthouses
Marine architecture
Caissons